David Goode (born 1971) is a British organist and composer.

Life and career
Goode was a chorister at St Paul's Cathedral, briefly attended Wells Cathedral School, was then a music scholar at Eton College and then organ scholar at King's College, Cambridge 1991–94. While there, he studied the organ with David Sanger and Jacques van Oortmerssen. From 1996–2001, he was sub-organist at Christ Church, Oxford. He won major prizes at the 1997 St. Alban's Interpretation Competition and at the 1998 Calgary Competition. From 2003 to 2005, he was the organist-in-residence at First Congregational Church in Los Angeles California. He was Organist at Eton College from 2005-2022.

Discography
Johann Sebastian Bach: The Complete Organ Works, Signum
A Parry Collection - Regent Records
Bach from Freiberg Cathedral - Signum
Max Reger: Organ Works, Volumes 2 and 3 - Signum
Max Reger: Complete Organ Works, Volume 1 – Herald
Orb and Sceptre – Herald
Commotio – Herald
The Organ of the Sheldonian Theatre, Oxford
The Great Organs of First Church, Volume 2 – Gothic
French Showpieces from King's
Organs of Cambridge, Volume 3

References

External links 
 

English classical organists
British male organists
Living people
1971 births
Alumni of King's College, Cambridge
21st-century organists
21st-century British male musicians
Organ Scholars of King's College, Cambridge
Male classical organists